The 2002–03 Bundesliga was the 40th season of the Bundesliga. It began on 9 August 2002 and concluded on 24 May 2003. This was the first season where the defending champions kicked–off the opening match.

Teams
Eighteen teams competed in the league – the top fifteen teams from the previous season and the three teams promoted from the 2. Bundesliga. The promoted teams were Hannover 96, Arminia Bielefeld and VfL Bochum, returning to the top flight after an absence of thirteen, two and one years respectively. They replaced SC Freiburg, 1. FC Köln and FC St. Pauli after spending time in the top flight for four, two and one years respectively.

Team overview

(*) Promoted from 2. Bundesliga.

1 VfL Wolfsburg played their first seven home matches at the VfL Stadion before permanently moving to the Volkswagen Arena.

League table
The final table of the 1st Bundesliga, Season 2002/03

Results

Overall
Most wins - Bayern Munich (23)
Fewest wins - Energie Cottbus (7)
Most draws - Borussia Dortmund and Schalke 04 (13)
Fewest draws - Werder Bremen (4)
Most losses - 1. FC Nürnberg (20)
Fewest losses - Bayern Munich (5)
Most goals scored - Bayern Munich (70)
Fewest goals scored - 1. FC Nürnberg (33)
Most goals conceded - Energie Cottbus (64)
Fewest goals conceded - Bayern Munich (25)

Top goalscorers

Hat-tricks 

 4 Player scored 4 goals

Champion squad

References

External links

2002–03 Bundesliga on kicker.de

Bundesliga seasons
1
Germany